Jeroen Maarten Wiedenhof (born 1959 in 's-Hertogenbosch) is a senior lecturer at the Department of Chinese Studies at the University of Leiden, and an expert on Chinese linguistics, particularly Mandarin Chinese. He is a member of the Leiden School of linguistic theory.

References

External links
Official website

Linguists from the Netherlands
1959 births
Living people
People from 's-Hertogenbosch